Trupanea pseudoamoena is a species of tephritid or fruit flies in the genus Trupanea of the family Tephritidae.

Distribution
Saudi Arabia, Israel.

References

Tephritinae
Insects described in 1974
Diptera of Asia